Di buen día a papá is a 2005 Bolivian film directed by Fernando Vargas.

External links

2005 romantic drama films
2005 films
Bolivian romantic drama films